Hof is a village in Åsnes Municipality in Innlandet county, Norway. The village sits in a fairly flat agricultural area. Hof is also a parish within the municipality, based at the local Hof Church.

History
The historic Hof Church (whose name refers to an heathen temple) has been located in this village for centuries. The church and village area of Hof are located on the west side of the river Glomma, although the river actually changed course in the area around the year 1450. Previously the church was on the east side before the river broke through its boundaries and changed course, going the other way around the village.

Hof was the administrative centre of the old municipality of Hof which existed from 1838 to 1963.

Media gallery

References

Åsnes
Villages in Innlandet